Cleto Bellucci (23 April 1921 – 7 March 2013) was an Italian Prelate of Roman Catholic Church.

Biography
Cleto Bellucci was born in Ancona, Italy and ordained a priest on 27 January 1946. Bellucci was appointed auxiliary archbishop of the Diocese of Taranto on 15 March 1969 as well as titular bishop of Melzi and ordained bishop on 14 May 1969. Bellucci was appointed Coadjutor bishop to the Archdiocese of Fermo on 9 July 1973, and succeeded Norberto Perini after his retirement on 21 June 1976. Bellucci retired as archbishop of Fermo on 18 June 1997. He died on 7 March 2013 after being rushed to the hospital of Fermo that day from his home.

References

External links
Catholic-Hierarchy 
Fermo Archdiocese (Italian)

20th-century Italian Roman Catholic bishops
21st-century Italian Roman Catholic bishops
Archbishops of Fermo
1921 births
2013 deaths